Giovanni Óscar Calderón Bassi (born 8 July 1971) is a Chilean politician and lawyer.

He is political commentator in the Radio Agricultura. Similarly, he has been columnist of La Tercera.

Early life
Calderón Bassi completed his primary and secondary studies at the Liceo Pedro Troncoso Machuca, the Escuela República de Colombia DN63 and at the Instituto Nacional General José Miguel Carrera. Then, he entered the Pontificia Universidad Católica de Valparaíso, where he did his BA in laws.

Political career
In 2009, Calderón Bassi was elected Deputy for 6th District for the period 2010−2012. 

In the chamber, he was a member of the permanent Commissions of Constitution, Legislation and Justice and Citizen Security and Drugs. Similarly, Calderón Bassi was member of the Investigative Commissions on the Expenditure of Public Funds assigned to NGOs during 2006−2010, on Citizen Security during the 2010 Chilean earthquake and on the «Bombs Case».

References

External links
 Profile at Chamber of Deputies

1971 births
Living people
Chilean people
Pontifical Catholic University of Valparaíso alumni
Independent Democratic Union politicians